This is a detailed discography for American rock and roll, country, and gospel singer-songwriter Jerry Lee Lewis (1935–2022). One of the pioneers of rockabilly, Lewis recorded over 40 albums in a career spanning seven decades. Lewis was a versatile artist, and recorded songs in multiple genres. Lewis, in 1986, was one of the first inductees into the Rock and Roll Hall of Fame, and was the last surviving rock and roll pioneer of Sun Records. Some of his best known songs are "Great Balls of Fire", "Whole Lotta Shakin' Goin' On", and "High School Confidential". His album, Live at the Star Club, Hamburg, is widely considered one of the greatest live concert albums ever. In his lengthy career in music, Lewis had 30 songs reach the top ten on the "Billboard Country-and-Western" chart. Lewis was regarded as one of the greatest and most influential pianists of the rock and roll era, and was ranked number 24 on Rolling Stone magazine's list of the "100 Greatest Artists of All Time".

Studio albums
{| class="wikitable"
! rowspan="2"| Title
! rowspan="2"| Album details
! colspan="5"|Chart positions
|-
! width="45"| US
! width="45"| US Country
! width="45"| CAN
! width="45"| AUS
! width="45"| UK
|-
| Jerry Lee Lewis
| 
 Released: March 1958
 Label: Sun Records
| align="center"| —
| align="center"| —
| align="center"| —
| align="center"| —
| align="center"| —
|-
| Jerry Lee's Greatest!
|
 Released: December 1961
 Label: Sun Records
| align="center"| —
| align="center"| —
| align="center"| —
| align="center"| —
| align="center"| 12
|-
| Golden Hits of Jerry Lee Lewis (re-recordings)
|
 Released: c. January 1964
 Label: Smash Records
| align="center"| 40
| align="center"| —
| align="center"| —
| align="center"| —
| align="center"| —
|-
| The Return of Rock
|
 Released: 1965
 Label: Smash Records
| align="center"| 64
| align="center"| —
| align="center"| —
| align="center"| —
| align="center"| —
|-
| Country Songs for City Folks/All Country
|
 Released: 1965
 Label: Smash Records
| align="center"| —
| align="center"| 39
| align="center"| —
| align="center"| —
| align="center"| —
|-
| Memphis Beat
|
 Released: 1966
 Label: Smash Records
| align="center"| 145
| align="center"| —
| align="center"| —
| align="center"| —
| align="center"| —
|-
| Soul My Way
|
 Released: 1967
 Label: Smash Records
| align="center"| —
| align="center"| —
| align="center"| —
| align="center"| —
| align="center"| —
|-
| Another Place, Another Time
|
 Released: 1968
 Label: Smash Records
| align="center"| 160
| align="center"| 3
| align="center"| —
| align="center"| —
| align="center"| —
|- 
| She Still Comes Around
|
 Released: 1969
 Label: Smash Records
| align="center"| —
| align="center"| 12
| align="center"| —
| align="center"| —
| align="center"| —
|-
| Sings the Country Music Hall of Fame Hits, Vol. 1
|
 Released: 1969
 Label: Smash Records
| align="center"| 127
| align="center"| 2
| align="center"| —
| align="center"| —
| align="center"| —
|-
| Sings the Country Music Hall of Fame Hits, Vol. 2
|
 Released: 1969
 Label: Smash Records
| align="center"| 124
| align="center"| 5
| align="center"| —
| align="center"| —
| align="center"| —
|-
| The Golden Cream of the Country
|
 Released: 1969
 Label: Sun Records
| align="center"| —
| align="center"| 11
| align="center"| —
| align="center"| —
| align="center"| —
|-
| She Even Woke Me Up to Say Goodbye
|
 Released: 1970
 Label: Mercury Records
| align="center"| 186
| align="center"| 9
| align="center"| —
| align="center"| —
| align="center"| —
|-
| In Loving Memories: The Jerry Lee Lewis Gospel Album
|
 Released: 1971
 Label: Mercury Records
| align="center"| 213
| align="center"| 18
| align="center"| —
| align="center"| —
| align="center"| —
|-
| There Must Be More to Love Than This
|
 Released: 1971
 Label: Mercury Records
| align="center"| 190
| align="center"| 8
| align="center"| —
| align="center"| —
| align="center"| —
|-
| Touching Home
|
 Released: 1971
 Label: Mercury Records
| align="center"| 152
| align="center"| 11
| align="center"| —
| align="center"| —
| align="center"| —
|-
| Would You Take Another Chance on Me?
|
 Released: 1971
 Label: Mercury Records
| align="center"| 115
| align="center"| 3
| align="center"| —
| align="center"| —
| align="center"| —
|-
| The Killer Rocks On
|
 Released: 1972
 Label: Mercury Records
| align="center"| 105
| align="center"| 4
| align="center"| —
| align="center"| 30
| align="center"| —
|-
| Who's Gonna Play This Old Piano?
|
 Released: 1972
 Label: Mercury Records
| align="center"| 201
| align="center"| 3
| align="center"| —
| align="center"| —
| align="center"| —
|-
| The Session...Recorded in London with Great Artists
|
 Released: 1973
 Label: Mercury Records
| align="center"| 37
| align="center"| 4
| align="center"| 12
| align="center"| 36
| align="center"| —
|-
| Sometimes a Memory Ain't Enough
|
 Released: 1973
 Label: Mercury Records
| align="center"| —
| align="center"| 6
| align="center"| —
| align="center"| —
| align="center"| —
|-
| Southern Roots: Back Home to Memphis
|
 Released: 1973
 Label: Mercury Records
| align="center"| —
| align="center"| 6
| align="center"| —
| align="center"| —
| align="center"| —
|-
| I-40 Country
|
 Released: 1974
 Label: Mercury Records
| align="center"| —
| align="center"| 25
| align="center"| —
| align="center"| —
| align="center"| —
|-
| Boogie Woogie Country Man
|
 Released: 1975
 Label: Mercury Records
| align="center"| —
| align="center"| 16
| align="center"| —
| align="center"| —
| align="center"| —
|-
| Odd Man In
|
 Released: 1975
 Label: Mercury Records
| align="center"| —
| align="center"| 33
| align="center"| —
| align="center"| —
| align="center"| —
|-
| Country Class
|
 Released: 1976
 Label: Mercury Records
| align="center"| —
| align="center"| 18
| align="center"| —
| align="center"| —
| align="center"| —
|-
| Country Memories
|
 Released: 1977
 Label: Mercury Records
| align="center"| —
| align="center"| 21
| align="center"| —
| align="center"| —
| align="center"| —
|-
| Jerry Lee Keeps Rockin'
|
 Released: 1979
 Label: Mercury Records
| align="center"| —
| align="center"| 40
| align="center"| —
| align="center"| —
| align="center"| —
|-
| Jerry Lee Lewis
|
 Released: 1979
 Label: Elektra Records
| align="center"| 186
| align="center"| 23
| align="center"| —
| align="center"| —
| align="center"| —
|-
| When Two Worlds Collide
|
 Released: 1980
 Label: Elektra Records
| align="center"| —
| align="center"| 32
| align="center"| —
| align="center"| —
| align="center"| —
|-
| Killer Country
|
 Released: 1980
 Label: Elektra Records
| align="center"| —
| align="center"| 35
| align="center"| —
| align="center"| —
| align="center"| —
|- 
| My Fingers Do the Talkin'''
|
 Released: 1983
 Label: MCA Records
| align="center"| —
| align="center"| 62
| align="center"| —
| align="center"| —
| align="center"| —
|-
| I Am What I Am|
 Released: 1984
 Label: MCA Records
| align="center"| —
| align="center"| —
| align="center"| —
| align="center"| —
| align="center"| —
|-
| Get Out Your Big Roll Daddy|
 Released: 1986
 Label: SCR Records
| align="center"| —
| align="center"| —
| align="center"| —
| align="center"| —
| align="center"| —
|-
| Young Blood|
 Released: 1995
 Label: Sire Records
| align="center"| 31
| align="center"| —
| align="center"| —
| align="center"| —
| align="center"| —
|-
| Last Man StandingA (duets album)
|
 Released: 2006
 Label: Artists First
| align="center"| 26
| align="center"| 4
| align="center"| 34
| align="center"| 46
| align="center"| —
|-
| Mean Old Man (duets album)
|
 Released: 2010
 Label: Verve Records
| align="center"| 30
| align="center"| —
| align="center"| 30
| align="center"| —
| align="center"| —
|-
| Rock & Roll TimeB
|
 Released: 2014
 Label: Vanguard Records
| align="center"| 140
| align="center"| 27
| align="center"| —
| align="center"| —
| align="center"| —
|}
ALast Man Standing peaked at No. 6 on the Americana Radio Pop Chart, No. 9 on the CIMS Pop Chart, No. 8 on the Billboard Rock Chart and No. 1 on Billboard's Independent Albums chart.
BRock & Toll Time'' peaked at No. 33 on the Billboard Rock Chart and No. 30 on Billboard's Independent Albums chart.

Live albums

Collaboration albums

Soundtrack albums

Compilation albums

Singles

1950s

1960s

1970s

1980s–2000s

Billboard Year-End performances

Other singles

Singles from collaboration albums

Guest singles

Music videos

Other appearances

Notes

References

External links
 
 Jerry Lee Lewis LP Discography

Country music discographies
Discographies of American artists
Rock music discographies